

Events

Pre-1600
362 BC – Battle of Mantinea: The Thebans, led by Epaminondas, defeated the Spartans. 
 414 – Emperor Theodosius II, age 13, yields power to his older sister Aelia Pulcheria, who reigned as regent and proclaimed herself empress (Augusta) of the Eastern Roman Empire.
 836 – Pactum Sicardi, a peace treaty between the Principality of Benevento and the Duchy of Naples, is signed.
 993 – Ulrich of Augsburg is canonized as a saint.
1054 – A supernova, called SN 1054, is seen by Chinese Song dynasty, Arab, and possibly Amerindian observers near the star Zeta Tauri. For several months it remains bright enough to be seen during the day. Its remnants form the Crab Nebula.
1120 – Jordan II of Capua is anointed as prince after his infant nephew's death.
1187 – The Crusades: Battle of Hattin: Saladin defeats Guy of Lusignan, King of Jerusalem.
1253 – Battle of West-Capelle: John I of Avesnes defeats Guy of Dampierre.
1359 – Francesco II Ordelaffi of Forlì surrenders to the Papal commander Gil de Albornoz.
1456 – Ottoman–Hungarian wars: The Siege of Nándorfehérvár (Belgrade) begins.
1534 – Christian III is elected King of Denmark and Norway in the town of Rye.
1584 – Philip Amadas and Arthur Barlowe arrive at Roanoke Island

1601–1900
1610 – The Battle of Klushino is fought between forces of the Polish–Lithuanian Commonwealth and Russia during the Polish–Muscovite War.
1634 – The city of Trois-Rivières is founded in New France (now Quebec, Canada).
1744 – The Treaty of Lancaster, in which the Iroquois cede lands between the Allegheny Mountains and the Ohio River to the British colonies, was signed in Lancaster, Pennsylvania.
1774 – Orangetown Resolutions are adopted in the Province of New York, one of many protests against the British Parliament's Coercive Acts.
1776 – American Revolution: The United States Declaration of Independence is adopted by the Second Continental Congress.
1778 – American Revolutionary War: U.S. forces under George Clark capture Kaskaskia during the Illinois campaign.
1802 – At West Point, New York, the United States Military Academy opens.
1803 – The Louisiana Purchase is announced to the American people.
1817 – In Rome, New York, construction on the Erie Canal begins.
1818 – US Flag Act of 1818 goes into effect creating a 13 stripe flag with a star for each state. New stars would be added on 4th of July after a new state had been admitted. 
1826 – John Adams and Thomas Jefferson, respectively the second and third presidents of the United States, die on the same day, on the fiftieth anniversary of the adoption of the United States Declaration of Independence. Adams' last words were, "Thomas Jefferson survives," not knowing that Jefferson had died hours earlier.
1827 – Slavery is abolished in the State of New York.
1831 – Samuel Francis Smith writes "My Country, 'Tis of Thee" for the Boston, Massachusetts July 4 festivities.
1832 – John Neal delivers the first public lecture in the US to advocate the rights of women.
1837 – Grand Junction Railway, the world's first long-distance railway, opens between Birmingham and Liverpool.
1838 – The Iowa Territory is organized.
1845 – Henry David Thoreau moves into a small cabin on Walden Pond in Concord, Massachusetts. Thoreau's account of his two years there, Walden, will become a touchstone of the environmental movement.
1855 – The first edition of Walt Whitman's book of poems, Leaves of Grass, is published in Brooklyn.
1862 – Lewis Carroll tells Alice Liddell a story that would grow into Alice's Adventures in Wonderland and its sequels.
1863 – American Civil War: Siege of Vicksburg: Vicksburg, Mississippi surrenders to U.S. forces under Ulysses S. Grant after 47 days of siege. 
  1863   – American Civil War: Union forces repulse a Confederate army at the Battle of Helena in Arkansas. The Confederate loss fails to relieve pressure on the besieged city of Vicksburg, and paves the way for the Union to capture Little Rock.
  1863   – American Civil War: The Army of Northern Virginia withdraws from the battlefield after losing the Battle of Gettysburg, signalling an end to the Confederate invasion of U.S. territory.
1879 – Anglo-Zulu War: The Zululand capital of Ulundi is captured by British troops and burned to the ground, ending the war and forcing King Cetshwayo to flee.
1881 – In Alabama, the Tuskegee Institute opens.
1886 – The Canadian Pacific Railway's first scheduled train from Montreal arrives in Port Moody on the Pacific coast, after six days of travel.
1887 – The founder of Pakistan, Quaid-i-Azam Muhammad Ali Jinnah, joins Sindh-Madrasa-tul-Islam, Karachi.
1892 – Western Samoa changes the International Date Line, causing Monday (July 4) to occur twice, resulting in a year with 367 days.
1894 – The short-lived Republic of Hawaii is proclaimed by Sanford B. Dole.
1898 – En route from New York to Le Havre, the SS La Bourgogne collides with another ship and sinks off the coast of Sable Island, with the loss of 549 lives.

1901–present
1901 – William Howard Taft becomes American governor of the Philippines.
1903 – The Philippine–American War is officially concluded.
1910 – The Johnson–Jeffries riots occur after African-American boxer Jack Johnson knocks out white boxer Jim Jeffries in the 15th round. Between 11 and 26 people are killed and hundreds more injured.
1911 – A massive heat wave strikes the northeastern United States, killing 380 people in eleven days and breaking temperature records in several cities.
1913 – President Woodrow Wilson addresses American Civil War veterans at the Great Reunion of 1913.
1914 – The funeral of Archduke Franz Ferdinand and his wife Sophie takes place in Vienna, six days after their assassinations in Sarajevo.
1918 – Mehmed V died at the age of 73 and Ottoman sultan Mehmed VI ascends to the throne.
  1918   – World War I: The Battle of Hamel, a successful attack by the Australian Corps against German positions near the town of Le Hamel on the Western Front.
  1918   – Bolsheviks kill Tsar Nicholas II of Russia and his family (Julian calendar date).
1927 – First flight of the Lockheed Vega.
1939 – Lou Gehrig, recently diagnosed with Amyotrophic lateral sclerosis, informs a crowd at Yankee Stadium that he considers himself "The luckiest man on the face of the earth", then announces his retirement from major league baseball.
1941 – Nazi crimes against the Polish nation: Nazi troops massacre Polish scientists and writers in the captured Ukrainian city of Lviv.
  1941   – World War II: The Burning of the Riga synagogues: The Great Choral Synagogue in German-occupied Riga is burnt with 300 Jews locked in the basement.
1942 – World War II: The 250-day Siege of Sevastopol in the Crimea ends when the city falls to Axis forces.
1943 – World War II: The Battle of Kursk, the largest full-scale battle in history and the world's largest tank battle, begins in the village of Prokhorovka.
  1943   – World War II: In Gibraltar, a Royal Air Force B-24 Liberator bomber crashes into the sea in an apparent accident moments after takeoff, killing sixteen passengers on board, including general Władysław Sikorski, the commander-in-chief of the Polish Army and the Prime Minister of the Polish government-in-exile; only the pilot survives.
1946 – The Kielce pogrom against Jewish Holocaust survivors in Poland.
  1946   – After 381 years of near-continuous colonial rule by various powers, the Philippines attains full independence from the United States.
1947 – The "Indian Independence Bill" is presented before the British House of Commons, proposing the independence of the Provinces of British India into two sovereign countries: India and Pakistan.
1950 – Cold War: Radio Free Europe first broadcasts.
1951 – Cold War: A court in Czechoslovakia sentences American journalist William N. Oatis to ten years in prison on charges of espionage.
  1951   – William Shockley announces the invention of the junction transistor.
1954 – Rationing ends in the United Kingdom.
1960 – Due to the post-Independence Day admission of Hawaii as the 50th U.S. state on August 21, 1959, the 50-star flag of the United States debuts in Philadelphia, almost ten and a half months later (see Flag Acts (United States)).
1961 – On its maiden voyage, the Soviet nuclear-powered submarine K-19 suffers a complete loss of coolant to its reactor. The crew are able to effect repairs, but 22 of them die of radiation poisoning over the following two years.
1966 – U.S. President Lyndon B. Johnson signs the Freedom of Information Act into United States law. The act went into effect the next year.
1976 – Israeli commandos raid Entebbe airport in Uganda, rescuing all but four of the passengers and crew of an Air France jetliner seized by Palestinian terrorists.
  1976   – The U.S. celebrates its Bicentennial.
1977 – The George Jackson Brigade plants a bomb at the main power substation for the Washington state capitol in Olympia, in solidarity with a prison strike at the Walla Walla State Penitentiary Intensive Security Unit.
1982 – Three Iranian diplomats and a journalist are kidnapped in Lebanon by Phalange forces, and their fate remains unknown.
1987 – In France, former Gestapo chief Klaus Barbie (a.k.a. the "Butcher of Lyon") is convicted of crimes against humanity and sentenced to life imprisonment.
1994 – Rwandan genocide: Kigali, the Rwandan capital, is captured by the Rwandan Patriotic Front, ending the genocide in the city.
1997 – NASA's Pathfinder space probe lands on the surface of Mars.
1998 – Japan launches the Nozomi probe to Mars, joining the United States and Russia as a space exploring nation.
2001 – Vladivostock Air Flight 352 crashes on approach to Irkutsk Airport killing all 145 people on board.
2002 – A Boeing 707 crashes near Bangui M'Poko International Airport in Bangui, Central African Republic, killing 28.
2004 – The cornerstone of the Freedom Tower is laid on the World Trade Center site in New York City.
  2004   – Greece beats Portugal in the UEFA Euro 2004 Final and becomes European Champion for first time in its history. 
2005 – The Deep Impact collider hits the comet Tempel 1.
2006 – Space Shuttle program: Discovery launches STS-121 to the International Space Station. The event gained wide media attention as it was the only shuttle launch in the program's history to occur on the United States' Independence Day.
2009 – The Statue of Liberty's crown reopens to the public after eight years of closure due to security concerns following the September 11 attacks.
  2009   – The first of four days of bombings begins on the southern Philippine island group of Mindanao.
2012 – The discovery of particles consistent with the Higgs boson at the Large Hadron Collider is announced at CERN.
2015 – Chile claims its first title in international football by defeating Argentina in the 2015 Copa América Final.

Births

Pre-1600
68 – Salonia Matidia, Roman daughter of Ulpia Marciana (d. 119)
1095 – Usama ibn Munqidh, Muslim poet, author and faris (Knight) (d. 1188)
1330 – Ashikaga Yoshiakira, Japanese shōgun (d. 1367)
1477 – Johannes Aventinus, Bavarian historian and philologist (d. 1534)
1546 – Murad III, Ottoman sultan (d. 1595)

1601–1900
1656 – John Leake, Royal Navy admiral (d. 1720)
1694 – Louis-Claude Daquin, French organist and composer (d. 1772)
1715 – Christian Fürchtegott Gellert, German poet and academic (d. 1769)
1719 – Michel-Jean Sedaine, French playwright (d. 1797) 
1729 – George Leonard, American lawyer, jurist and politician (d. 1819)
1753 – Jean-Pierre Blanchard, French inventor, best known as a pioneer in balloon flight (d. 1809)
1790 – George Everest, Welsh geographer and surveyor (d. 1866)
1799 – Oscar I of Sweden (d. 1859)
1804 – Nathaniel Hawthorne, American novelist and short story writer (d. 1864)
1807 – Giuseppe Garibaldi, Italian general and politician (d. 1882)
1816 – Hiram Walker, American businessman, founded Canadian Club whisky (d. 1899)
1826 – Stephen Foster, American songwriter and composer (d. 1864)
1842 – Hermann Cohen, German philosopher (d. 1918)
1845 – Thomas John Barnardo, Irish philanthropist and humanitarian (d. 1905)
1847 – James Anthony Bailey, American circus ringmaster, co-founded Ringling Bros. and Barnum & Bailey Circus (d. 1906)
1854 – Victor Babeș, Romanian physician and biologist (d. 1926)
1868 – Henrietta Swan Leavitt, American astronomer and academic (d. 1921)
1886 – Tom Longboat, Canadian runner and soldier (d. 1949)
1871 – Hubert Cecil Booth, English engineer (d. 1955)
1872 – Calvin Coolidge, American lawyer and politician, 30th President of the United States (d. 1933)
1874 – John McPhee, Australian journalist and politician, 27th Premier of Tasmania (d. 1952)
1880 – Victor Kraft, Austrian philosopher from the Vienna Circle (d. 1975)
1881 – Ulysses S. Grant III, American general (d. 1968)
1883 – Rube Goldberg, American sculptor, cartoonist, and engineer (d. 1970)
1887 – Pio Pion, Italian engineer and businessman (d. 1965)
1888 – Henry Armetta, Italian-American actor and singer (d. 1945)
1895 – Irving Caesar, American songwriter and composer (d. 1996)
1896 – Mao Dun, Chinese journalist, author, and critic (d. 1981)
1897 – Alluri Sitarama Raju, Indian activist (d. 1924)
1898 – Pilar Barbosa, Puerto Rican-American historian and activist (d. 1997)
  1898   – Gertrude Lawrence, British actress, singer, and dancer (d. 1952)
  1898   – Gulzarilal Nanda, Indian politician (d. 1998)
  1898   – Gertrude Weaver, American supercentenarian (d. 2015)
1900 – Belinda Dann, Indigenous Australian who was one of the Stolen Generation, reunited with family aged 107 (d. 2007)
  1900   – Nellie Mae Rowe, American folk artist (d. 1982)

1901–present
1902 – Meyer Lansky, American gangster (d. 1983)
  1902   – George Murphy, American actor and politician (d. 1992)
1903 – Flor Peeters, Belgian organist, composer, and educator (d. 1986)
1904 – Angela Baddeley, English actress (d. 1976)
1905 – Irving Johnson, American sailor and author (d. 1991)
  1905   – Robert Hankey, 2nd Baron Hankey, British diplomat and public servant (d. 1996)
  1905   – Lionel Trilling, American critic, essayist, short story writer, and educator (d. 1975)
1906 – Vincent Schaefer, American chemist and meteorologist (d. 1993)
1907 – John Anderson, American discus thrower (d. 1948)
  1907   – Howard Taubman, American author and critic (d. 1996)
1909 – Alec Templeton, Welsh composer, pianist and satirist (d. 1963) 
1910 – Robert K. Merton, American sociologist and scholar (d. 2003)
  1910   – Gloria Stuart, American actress (d. 2010)
1911 – Bruce Hamilton, Australian public servant (d. 1989)
  1911   – Mitch Miller, American singer and producer (d. 2010)
  1911   – Elizabeth Peratrovich, Alaskan-American civil rights activist (d. 1958)
1914 – Nuccio Bertone, Italian automobile designer (d. 1997)
1915 – Timmie Rogers, American actor and singer-songwriter (d. 2006)
1916 – Iva Toguri D'Aquino, American typist and broadcaster (d. 2006)
1918 – Eppie Lederer, American journalist and radio host (d. 2002)
  1918   – Johnnie Parsons, American race car driver (d. 1984)
  1918   – King Taufa'ahau Tupou IV of Tonga, (d. 2006)
  1918   – Alec Bedser, English cricketer (d. 2010)
  1918   – Eric Bedser, English cricketer (d. 2006)
  1918   – Pauline Phillips, American journalist and radio host, created Dear Abby (d. 2013)
1920 – Norm Drucker, American basketball player and referee (d. 2015)
  1920   – Leona Helmsley, American businesswoman (d. 2007)
  1920   – Fritz Wilde, German footballer and manager (d. 1977)
  1920   – Paul Bannai, American politician (d. 2019)
1921 – Gérard Debreu, French economist and mathematician, Nobel Prize laureate (d. 2004)
  1921   – Nasser Sharifi, Iranian sports shooter
  1921   – Metropolitan Mikhail of Asyut (d. 2014)
  1921   – Philip Rose, American actor, playwright, and producer (d. 2011)
  1921   – Tibor Varga, Hungarian violinist and conductor (d. 2003)
1922 – R. James Harvey, American politician (d. 2019)
1923 – Rudolf Friedrich, Swiss lawyer and politician (d. 2013)
1924 – Eva Marie Saint, American actress 
  1924   – Delia Fiallo, Cuban author and screenwriter (d. 2021)
1925 – Ciril Zlobec, Slovene poet, writer, translator, journalist and politician (d. 2018)
  1925   – Dorothy Head Knode, American tennis player (d. 2015)
1926 – Alfredo Di Stéfano, Argentinian-Spanish footballer and coach (d. 2014)
  1926   – Lake Underwood, American race car driver and businessman (d. 2008)
1927 – Gina Lollobrigida, Italian actress and photographer (d. 2023)
  1927   – Neil Simon, American playwright and screenwriter (d. 2018)
1928 – Giampiero Boniperti, Italian footballer and politician (d. 2021)
  1928   – Teofisto Guingona Jr., Filipino politician; 11th Vice President of the Philippines
  1928   – Jassem Alwan, Syrian Army Officer (d. 2018)
  1928   – Shan Ratnam, Sri Lankan physician and academic (d. 2001)
  1928   – Chuck Tanner, American baseball player and manager (d. 2011)
1929 – Al Davis, American football player, coach, and manager (d. 2011)
  1929   – Bill Tuttle, American baseball player (d. 1998)
1930 – George Steinbrenner, American businessman (d. 2010)
1931 – Stephen Boyd, Northern Ireland-born American actor (d. 1977)
  1931   – Rick Casares, American football player and soldier (d. 2013)
  1931   – Sébastien Japrisot, French author, director, and screenwriter (d. 2003)
  1931   – Peter Richardson, English cricketer (d. 2017)
1932 – Aurèle Vandendriessche, Belgian runner
1934 – Yvonne B. Miller, American academic and politician (d. 2012)
  1934   – Colin Welland, English actor and screenwriter (d. 2015)
1935 – Paul Scoon, Grenadian politician, 2nd Governor-General of Grenada (d. 2013)
1936 – Zdzisława Donat, Polish soprano and actress
1937 – Thomas Nagel, American philosopher and academic
  1937   – Queen Sonja of Norway
  1937   – Richard Rhodes, American journalist and historian
  1937   – Eric Walters, Australian journalist (d. 2010)
1938 – Steven Rose, English biologist and academic
  1938   – Bill Withers, American singer-songwriter and producer (d. 2020)
1940 – Pat Stapleton, Canadian ice hockey player (d. 2020)
1941 – Sam Farr, American politician
  1941   – Tomaž Šalamun, Croatian-Slovenian poet and academic (d. 2014)
  1941   – Pavel Sedláček, Czech singer-songwriter and guitarist
  1941   – Brian Willson, American soldier, lawyer, and activist
1942 – Hal Lanier, American baseball player, coach, and manager
  1942   – Floyd Little, American football player and coach (d. 2021)
  1942   – Stefan Meller, French-Polish academic and politician, Polish Minister of Foreign Affairs (d. 2008)
  1942   – Prince Michael of Kent
  1942   – Peter Rowan, American singer-songwriter and guitarist
1943 – Conny Bauer, German trombonist
  1943   – Emerson Boozer, American football player and sportscaster
  1943   – Adam Hart-Davis, English historian, author, and photographer
  1943   – Geraldo Rivera, American lawyer, journalist, and author
  1943   – Fred Wesley, American jazz and funk trombonist
  1943   – Alan Wilson, American singer-songwriter and guitarist (d. 1970)
1945 – Andre Spitzer, Romanian-Israeli fencer and coach (d. 1972)
1946 – Ron Kovic, American author and activist
  1946   – Michael Milken, American businessman and philanthropist
1947 – Lembit Ulfsak, Estonian actor and director (d. 2017)
1948 – René Arnoux, French race car driver
  1948   – Tommy Körberg, Swedish singer and actor
  1948   – Jeremy Spencer, English singer-songwriter and guitarist 
1950 – Philip Craven, English basketball player and swimmer
  1950   – David Jensen, Canadian-English radio and television host
1951 – John Alexander, Australian tennis player and politician 
  1951   – Ralph Johnson, American R&B drummer and percussionist 
  1951   – Vladimir Tismăneanu, Romanian-American political scientist, sociologist, and academic
  1951   – Kathleen Kennedy Townsend, American lawyer and politician, 6th Lieutenant Governor of Maryland
1952 – Álvaro Uribe, Colombian lawyer and politician, 39th President of Colombia
  1952   – Carol MacReady, English actress
  1952   – John Waite, English singer-songwriter and guitarist
  1952   – Paul Rogat Loeb, American author and activist 
1953 – Francis Maude, English lawyer and politician, Minister for the Cabinet Office
1954 – Jim Beattie, American baseball player, coach, and manager
  1954   – Morganna, American model, actress, and dancer
  1954   – Devendra Kumar Joshi, 21st Chief of Naval Staff of the Indian Navy
1955 – Eero Heinäluoma, Finnish politician
  1955   – Kevin Nichols, Australian cyclist
1956 – Robert Sinclair MacKay, British academic and educator
1957 – Rein Lang, Estonian politician and diplomat, 25th Estonian Minister of Foreign Affairs
1958 – Vera Leth, Greenlandic Ombudsman
  1958   – Kirk Pengilly, Australian guitarist, saxophonist, and songwriter 
  1958   – Carl Valentine, English-Canadian footballer, coach, and manager
1959 – Victoria Abril, Spanish actress and singer
1960 – Roland Ratzenberger, Austrian race car driver (d. 1994)
1961 – Richard Garriott, English-American video game designer, created the Ultima series
1962 – Pam Shriver, American tennis player and sportscaster
1963 – Henri Leconte, French tennis player and sportscaster
  1963   – Laureano Márquez, Spanish-Venezuelan political scientist and journalist
  1963   – José Oquendo, Puerto Rican-American baseball player and coach
  1963   – Sonia Pierre, Haitian-Dominican human rights activist (d. 2011)
1964 – Cle Kooiman, American soccer player and manager
  1964   – Elie Saab, Lebanese fashion designer
  1964   – Edi Rama, Albanian politician
  1964   – Mark Slaughter, American singer-songwriter and producer 
  1964   – Mark Whiting, American actor, director, and screenwriter
1965 – Harvey Grant, American basketball player and coach
  1965   – Horace Grant, American basketball player and coach
  1965   – Kiriakos Karataidis, Greek footballer and manager
  1965   – Gérard Watkins, English actor and playwright
1966 – Ronni Ancona, Scottish actress and screenwriter
  1966   – Minas Hantzidis, German-Greek footballer
  1966   – Lee Reherman, American actor (d. 2016)
1967 – Vinny Castilla, Mexican baseball player and manager
  1967   – Sébastien Deleigne, French athlete
1969 – Al Golden, American football player and coach
  1969   – Todd Marinovich, American football player and coach
  1969   – Wilfred Mugeyi, Zimbabwean footballer and coach
1972 – Stephen Giles, Canadian canoe racer and engineer 
  1972   – Mike Knuble, Canadian-American ice hockey player and coach
1973 – Keiko Ihara, Japanese race car driver
  1973   – Gackt, Japanese musician, singer, songwriter, record producer and actor
  1973   – Michael Johnson, English-Jamaican footballer and manager
  1973   – Anjelika Krylova, Russian ice dancer and coach
  1973   – Jan Magnussen, Danish race car driver
  1973   – Tony Popovic, Australian footballer and manager
1974 – Jill Craybas, American tennis player
  1974   – La'Roi Glover, American football player and sportscaster
  1974   – Adrian Griffin, American basketball player and coach
1976 – Daijiro Kato, Japanese motorcycle racer (d. 2003)
  1976   – Yevgeniya Medvedeva, Russian skier
1978 – Marcos Daniel, Brazilian tennis player
  1978   – Émile Mpenza, Belgian footballer
1979 – Siim Kabrits, Estonian politician
  1979   – Josh McCown, American football player
  1979   – Renny Vega, Venezuelan footballer
1980 – Kwame Steede, Bermudan footballer
1981 – Dedé, Angolan footballer
  1981   – Brock Berlin, American football player
  1981   – Christoph Preuß, German footballer
  1981   – Francisco Cruceta, Dominican baseball player
  1981   – Will Smith, American football player (d. 2016)
1982 – Vladimir Boisa, Georgian basketball player
  1982   – Vladimir Gusev, Russian cyclist
  1982   – Jeff Lima, New Zealand rugby league player
  1982   – Michael "The Situation" Sorrentino, American model, author and television personality
1983 – Melanie Fiona, Canadian singer-songwriter
  1983   – Amantle Montsho, Botswanan sprinter
  1983   – Miguel Pinto, Chilean footballer
  1983   – Amol Rajan, Indian-English journalist
  1983   – Mattia Serafini, Italian footballer 
1984 – Jin Akanishi, Japanese singer-songwriter 
  1984   – Miguel Santos Soares, Timorese footballer
  1985   – Kane Tenace, Australian footballer
  1985   – Dimitrios Mavroeidis, Greek basketball player
  1985   – Wason Rentería, Colombian footballer
1986 – Ömer Aşık, Turkish basketball player
  1986   – Nguyen Ngoc Duy, Vietnamese footballer
  1986   – Rafael Arévalo, Salvadoran tennis player
  1986   – Willem Janssen, Dutch footballer
  1986   – Terrance Knighton, American football player
  1986   – Marte Elden, Norwegian skier
1987 – Wude Ayalew, Ethiopian runner
  1987   – Guram Kashia, Georgian footballer
1988 – Angelique Boyer, French-Mexican actress
1989 – Benjamin Büchel, Liechtensteiner footballer
1990 – Jake Gardiner, American ice hockey player
  1990   – Richard Mpong, Ghanaian footballer
  1990   – Naoki Yamada, Japanese footballer
  1990   – Ihar Yasinski, Belarusian footballer
1992 – Ángel Romero, Paraguayan footballer
  1992   – Óscar Romero, Paraguayan footballer
1993 – Tom Barkhuizen, English footballer
1995 – Post Malone, American rapper, singer, songwriter and record producer 
1999 – Moa Kikuchi, Japanese musician 
2003 – Polina Bogusevich, Russian singer

Deaths

Pre-1600
 673 – Ecgberht, king of Kent 
 907 – Luitpold, margrave of Bavaria
   907   – Dietmar I, archbishop of Salzburg
 910 – Luo Shaowei, Chinese warlord (b. 877)
 940 – Wang Jianli, Chinese general (b. 871)
 943 – Taejo of Goryeo, Korean king (b. 877)
 945 – Zhuo Yanming, Chinese Buddhist monk and emperor
 965 – Benedict V, pope of the Catholic Church
 973 – Ulrich of Augsburg, German bishop and saint (b. 890)
 975 – Gwangjong of Goryeo, Korean king (b. 925)
1187 – Raynald of Châtillon, French knight (b. 1125)
1307 – Rudolf I of Bohemia (b. 1281)
1336 – Saint Elizabeth of Portugal (b. 1271)
1429 – Carlo I Tocco, ruler of Epirus (b. 1372)
1533 – John Frith, English priest, writer, and martyr (b. 1503) 
1541 – Pedro de Alvarado, Spanish general and explorer (b. 1495)
1546 – Hayreddin Barbarossa, Ottoman admiral (b. 1478)
1551 – Gregory Cromwell, 1st Baron Cromwell, English politician (b. 1514)

1601–1900
1603 – Philippe de Monte, Flemish composer and educator (b. 1521)
1623 – William Byrd, English composer (b. c. 1540)
1644 – Brian Twyne, English academic, antiquarian and archivist (b. 1581)
1648 – Antoine Daniel, French missionary and saint, one of the eight Canadian Martyrs (b. 1601)
1742 – Luigi Guido Grandi, Italian monk, mathematician, and engineer (b. 1671)
1754 – Philippe Néricault Destouches, French playwright and author (b. 1680)
1761 – Samuel Richardson, English author and painter (b. 1689)
1780 – Prince Charles Alexander of Lorraine (b. 1712)
1787 – Charles, Prince of Soubise, Marshal of France (b. 1715)
1821 – Richard Cosway, English painter and academic (b. 1742)
1826 – John Adams, American lawyer and politician, 2nd President of the United States (b. 1735)
  1826   – Thomas Jefferson, American architect, lawyer, and politician, 3rd President of the United States (b. 1743)
1831 – James Monroe, American soldier, lawyer, and politician, 5th President of the United States (b. 1758)
1848 – François-René de Chateaubriand, French historian and politician (b. 1768)
1850 – William Kirby, English entomologist and author (b. 1759)
1854 – Karl Friedrich Eichhorn, German academic and jurist (b. 1781)
1857 – William L. Marcy, American lawyer, judge, and politician, 21st United States Secretary of State (b. 1786)
1881 – Johan Vilhelm Snellman, Finnish philosopher and politician (b. 1806)
1882 – Joseph Brackett, American composer and author (b. 1797)
1886 – Poundmaker, Canadian tribal chief (b. 1797)
1891 – Hannibal Hamlin, American lawyer and politician, 15th Vice President of the United States (b. 1809)

1901–present
1901 – Johannes Schmidt, German linguist and academic (b. 1843)
1902 – Vivekananda, Indian monk and saint (b. 1863)
1905 – Élisée Reclus, French geographer and author (b. 1830)
1910 – Melville Fuller, American lawyer and jurist, Chief Justice of the United States (b. 1833)
  1910   – Giovanni Schiaparelli, Italian astronomer and historian (b. 1835)
1916 – Alan Seeger, American soldier and poet (b. 1888)
1922 – Lothar von Richthofen, German lieutenant and pilot (b. 1894)
1926 – Pier Giorgio Frassati, Italian activist and saint (b. 1901)
1934 – Marie Curie, French-Polish physicist and chemist, Nobel Prize laureate (b. 1867)
1938 – Otto Bauer, Austrian philosopher and politician, Austrian Minister of Foreign Affairs (b. 1881)
  1938   – Suzanne Lenglen, French tennis player (b. 1899)
1941 – Antoni Łomnicki, Polish mathematician and academic (b. 1881)
1943 – Władysław Sikorski, Polish general and politician, 9th Prime Minister of the Second Republic of Poland (b. 1881)
1946 – Taffy O'Callaghan, Welsh footballer and coach (b. 1906)
1948 – Monteiro Lobato, Brazilian journalist and author (b. 1882)
1949 – François Brandt, Dutch rower and engineer (b. 1874)
1963 – Bernard Freyberg, 1st Baron Freyberg, New Zealand general and politician, 7th Governor-General of New Zealand (b. 1889)
  1963   – Clyde Kennard, American activist and martyr (b. 1927)
  1963   – Pingali Venkayya, Indian activist, designed the Flag of India (b. 1876) 
1964 – Gaby Morlay, French actress and singer (b. 1893)
1969 – Henri Decoin, French director and screenwriter (b. 1890)
1970 – Barnett Newman, American painter and illustrator (b. 1905)
  1970   – Harold Stirling Vanderbilt, American sailor and businessman (b. 1884)
1971 – August Derleth, American anthologist and author (b. 1909)
  1971   – Thomas C. Hart, American admiral and politician (b. 1877)
1974 – Georgette Heyer, English author (b. 1902)
  1974   – André Randall, French actor (b. 1892)
1976 – Yonatan Netanyahu, Israeli colonel (b. 1946)
  1976   – Antoni Słonimski, Polish poet and playwright (b. 1895)
1977 – Gersh Budker, Ukrainian physicist and academic (b. 1918)
1979 – Lee Wai Tong, Chinese footballer and manager (b. 1905)
1980 – Maurice Grevisse, Belgian linguist and author (b. 1895)
1984 – Jimmie Spheeris, American singer-songwriter (b. 1949)
1986 – Paul-Gilbert Langevin, French musicologist, critique musical and physicist (b. 1933)
  1986   – Flor Peeters, Belgian organist and composer (b. 1903)
  1986   – Oscar Zariski, Belarusian-American mathematician and academic (b. 1899)
1988 – Adrian Adonis, American wrestler (b. 1954)
1990 – Olive Ann Burns, American journalist and author (b. 1924)
1991 – Victor Chang, Chinese-Australian surgeon and physician (b. 1936)
  1991   – Art Sansom, American cartoonist (b. 1920)
1992 – Astor Piazzolla, Argentinian bandoneon player and composer (b. 1921)
1993 – Bona Arsenault, Canadian historian, genealogist, and politician (b. 1903)
1994 – Joey Marella, American wrestling referee (b. 1964)
1995 – Eva Gabor, Hungarian-American actress and singer (b. 1919)
  1995   – Bob Ross, American painter and television host (b. 1942)
1997 – Charles Kuralt, American journalist (b. 1934)
  1997   – John Zachary Young, English zoologist and neurophysiologist (b. 1907)
1999 – Leo Garel, American illustrator and educator (b. 1917)
2000 – Gustaw Herling-Grudziński, Polish journalist and author (b. 1919)
2002 – Gerald Bales, Canadian organist and composer (b. 1919)
  2002   – Benjamin O. Davis, Jr., American general (b. 1912)
2003 – Larry Burkett, American author and radio host (b. 1939)
  2003   – André Claveau, French singer (b. 1915)
  2003   – Barry White, American singer-songwriter, pianist, and producer (b. 1944)
2004 – Jean-Marie Auberson, Swiss violinist and conductor (b. 1920)
2005 – Cliff Goupille, Canadian ice hockey player (b. 1915)
  2005   – Hank Stram, American football player and coach (b. 1923)
2007 – Bill Pinkney, American singer (b. 1925)
2008 – Thomas M. Disch, American author and poet (b. 1940)
  2008   – Jesse Helms, American politician (b. 1921)
  2008   – Evelyn Keyes, American actress (b. 1916)
  2008   – Terrence Kiel, American football player (b. 1980)
  2008   – Charles Wheeler, German-English soldier and journalist (b. 1923)
2009 – Brenda Joyce, American actress (b. 1917)
  2009   – Allen Klein, American businessman and talent agent, founded ABKCO Records (b. 1931)
  2009   – Drake Levin, American guitarist (b. 1946)
  2009   – Steve McNair, American football player (b. 1973)
  2009   – Lasse Strömstedt, Swedish author and actor (b. 1935)
  2009   – Jean-Baptiste Tati Loutard, Congolese poet and politician (b. 1938)
2010 – Robert Neil Butler, American physician and author (b. 1927)
2012 – Hiren Bhattacharyya, Indian poet and author (b. 1932)
  2012   – Jimmy Bivins, American boxer (b. 1919)
  2012   – Jeong Min-hyeong, South Korean footballer (b. 1987)
  2012   – Eric Sykes, English actor, director, and screenwriter (b. 1923)
2013 – Onllwyn Brace, Welsh rugby player and sportscaster (b. 1932)
  2013   – Jack Crompton, English footballer and manager (b. 1921)
  2013   – James Fulton, American dermatologist and academic (b. 1940)
  2013   – Charles A. Hines, American general (b. 1935)
  2013   – Bernie Nolan, Irish singer (b. 1960)
2014 – Giorgio Faletti, Italian author, screenwriter, and actor (b. 1950)
  2014   – C. J. Henderson, American author and critic (b. 1951)
  2014   – Earl Robinson, American baseball player (b. 1936)
  2014   – Richard Mellon Scaife, American businessman (b. 1932)
2015 – Nedelcho Beronov, Bulgarian judge and politician (b. 1928)
  2015   – William Conrad Gibbons, American historian, author, and academic (b. 1926)
2016 – Abbas Kiarostami, Iranian film director, screenwriter, poet, and photographer (b. 1940)
2017 – John Blackwell, American R&B, funk, and jazz drummer (b. 1973)
  2017   – Daniil Granin, Soviet and Russian author (b. 1919)
  2017   – Gene Conley, American MLB player and NBA player (b. 1930)
2018 – Henri Dirickx, Belgian footballer (b. 1927)
  2018   – Robby Müller, Dutch cinematographer (b. 1940)
2021  – Harmoko, Indonesian politician, former parliament speaker and government minister (b. 1939)
2022  – Cláudio Hummes, Brazilian prelate of the Catholic Church (b. 1934)
  2022   – Kazuki Takahashi, Japanese manga artist (b. 1961)

Holidays and observances
Christian feast day:
Andrew of Crete
Bertha of Artois
Blessed Catherine Jarrige
Blessed Pier Giorgio Frassati
Elizabeth of Aragon (or of Portugal)
Oda of Canterbury
Ulrich of Augsburg
July 4 (Eastern Orthodox liturgics)
Birthday of Queen Sonja (Norway)
The first evening of Dree Festival, celebrated until July 7 (Apatani people, Arunachal Pradesh, India)
Independence Day (United States)
Liberation Day (Northern Mariana Islands)
Liberation Day (Rwanda)
Republic Day (Philippines)

References

External links

 
 
 

Days of the year
July